Kwilu Ngongo is a town in western Democratic Republic of the Congo.  It is located in the Kongo Central province. It is fairly near the Angola border.

Transport 

It is served by a station on the national railway system.

See also 

 Railway stations in DRCongo

References 

Populated places in Kongo Central